Le Ceneri Di Heliodoro is the twelfth album by Rome, released on January 18, 2019 on Trisol Music Group.

Track listing

References

2019 albums
Rome (band) albums